James or Jim Whitehead may refer to:
Sir James Whitehead, 1st Baronet (1834–1917), British merchant and Liberal Party politician
Sir James Beethom Whitehead (1858–1928), British diplomat
James Whitehead (cricketer, born 1860) (1860–1904), English cricketer, played for Warwickshire 1894–1900 and for Liverpool & District in 1891–92
Jimmy Whitehead (1870–1929), English footballer
James Whitehead (police officer) (1880–1955), British Indian Army officer and senior officer in the London Metropolitan Police
James Whitehead (cricketer, born 1890) (1890–1919), English cricketer, played for the MCC in 1912
James Whitehead (South African cricketer) (1882–1940), South African cricketer, played for Warwickshire, Western Province and Griqualand West
James Whitehead (poet) (1936–2003), American poet
Jim Whitehead (politician) (born 1942), American Republican member of the Georgia State Senate
Jim Whitehead (computer scientist), American computer scientist